Teodolinda Barolini is the Lorenzo Da Ponte Professor of Italian at Columbia University, and has twice served as Chair of the Department of Italian (1992–2004, 2011–2014).

Early life 
Barolini was born December 19, 1951 in Syracuse, New York. She is the daughter of Antonio Barolini and Helen Barolini.

Career 
In 1998, Barolini was awarded a Guggenheim Fellowship for the study of Italian literature. From 1997 to 2003, she served as president of the Dante Society of America.  She was elected to the American Philosophical Society in 2002. In 2007, she won a Flaiano Prize in Italian Studies. She is currently the editor-in-chief of Columbia University's Digital Dante website.

She has written on the poetry of Dante, Petrarch and Boccaccio.

Personal life 
Barolini is married to James J. Valentini, professor of Chemistry at Columbia and the sixteenth and current Dean of Columbia College.

References 

Columbia University faculty
Living people
Fellows of the Medieval Academy of America
Members of the American Philosophical Society
Dante scholars
1951 births